A Cross the Earth: Tear Down the Walls (stylized as [a_CROSS // the_EARTH] :: Tear Down The Walls) is the name for the 11th Hillsong United album.
It was released in Australia on 9 May 2009. The album reached No. 22 on the ARIA Albums Chart.

Originally a two-part project, the plans were later scrapped.

Track listing

Personnel 
 Worship leaders – Joel Houston, Brooke Ligertwood, Jad Gillies, Annie Garratt, Jonathon Douglass, Matt Crocker, David Ware, Sam Knock, Dylan Thomas, Joel Davies.
 Drums – Simon Kobler, Brandon Gillies
 Bass – Adam Crosariol, Ben Whincop
 Electric Guitars – Michael Guy Chislett, Timon Klein, Joel Hingston, Jad Gillies, Dylan Thomas, Andrew Hood, Nigel Hendroff
 Acoustic Guitars – Joel Houston, Jad Gillies, Brooke Ligertwood, Nigel Hendroff
 Keys – Autumn Hardman, Peter James, Benjamin Tennikoff, Michael Guy Chislett

Charts 

Year-end charts

References

External links 
 Official Hillsong music page
 Official Hillsong United page

Hillsong United albums
2009 live albums
2009 video albums
Live video albums

pt:Across the Earth